Bohemian Football League (ČFL) is one of the third level football leagues of the Czech Republic (the other is the Moravian-Silesian Football League). The league comprises teams from the historic Bohemia region.

History
The league was formed in 1991 during the Czechoslovakia era, replacing the former II. ČNL (II. Česká národni liga; Second Czech National League) at the third tier of Czechoslovak football alongside sister league MSFL.

Competition format
The winner of ČFL is promoted to Czech National Football League. In total three clubs are promoted to the ČFL - the winner of Divize A, the winner of Divize B and the winner of Divize C.

The format of the league was unconventional in that it did not allow draws. As of the 2014–15 season, if a match is tied, the winner is decided by a penalty shootout. The winner of the shootout gets two points and the loser gets one. From season 2019–20 on, Junior league (with B teams of first-league clubs) was canceled and the B teams were moved into the ČFL and MSFL. The competition was divided into two groups with 16 teams in each.

Since 2021-22 season, the teams are again awarded by 3 points for a win and 1 point for a tie.

Bohemian Football League clubs, 2022–23

Bohemian Football League A

Bohemian Football League B

Bohemian Football League (ČFL) champions

References 
 Information on ČMFS website

 
3
Czech
Professional sports leagues in the Czech Republic